International Studies Quarterly is a quarterly peer-reviewed academic journal of international studies and an official journal of the International Studies Association. It was established in 1959 and is published by Oxford University Press.  According to the Journal Citation Reports, the journal had a 2018 impact factor of 2.172. The editors-in-chief are Brandon C. Prins and Krista E. Wiegand (University of Tennessee).

See also 
 List of international relations journals
 List of political science journals

References

External links
 

International relations journals
Wiley-Blackwell academic journals
English-language journals
Quarterly journals
Publications established in 1959